MHA may refer to:

 Malaysian Highway Authority, a government agency under the Malaysian Ministry of Works
 Malta Handball Association, the governing body of handball in Malta
 Mandan, Hidatsa, and Arikara Nation, a Northern Plains Native American tribe
 Mast Head Amplifier, an amplifier (LNA) mounted as close as practical to the antenna
 Master of Health Administration, a degree awarded by many American, European and Australian universities
 May–Hegglin anomaly, a genetic disorder affecting the blood platelets
 Member of the House of Assembly, a legislative assembly member in parts of Australia and Canada
 Mental Health Act, stock short title used for legislation relating to mental health law
 Methodist Homes for the Aged, cares for older people and is part of MHA Care Group
 Microangiopathic hemolytic anemia, a type of  anemia, more commonly abbreviated MAHA
 Minimum holding altitude, an aviation term, see holding
 Minister of Home Affairs (India), a position in the Indian Cabinet, at both State and Union levels
 Mormon History Association, a nonprofit organization promoting research and publication
 Mueller–Hinton agar, an agar of beef infusion, peptone, and starch used primarily for antibiotic susceptibility testing
 My Hero Academia, a Japanese manga and anime series